"You Don't Know What Love Is" is a popular song of the Great American Songbook, written by Don Raye (lyrics) and Gene de Paul (music) for the Abbott and Costello film Keep 'Em Flying (1941), in which it was sung by Carol Bruce. The song was deleted from the film prior to release. The song was later included in Behind the Eight Ball (1942), starring the Ritz Brothers. "You Don't Know What Love Is" was again sung by Carol Bruce; it was her third and final film until the 1980s.

After Miles Davis recorded an instrumental version of the song in 1954, it became a jazz standard, with Dinah Washington releasing the definitive vocal version a year later. Other noteworthy recordings were made by Billie Holiday and Sonny Rollins.

Other versions
 Louis Armstrong
 Chet Baker – Chet Baker Sings and Plays (1955)
Art Blakey - Art Blakey!!!!! Jazz Messengers!!!!! (1961)
 John Coltrane – Ballads (1962)
 Larry Coryell - Lady Coryell (1968)
 Elvis Costello – Piano Jazz: McPartland/Costello (2005)
 Miles Davis – Walkin'  (1954)
 Eric Dolphy – Last Date (1964)
 Eric Kloss - Grits & Gravy  (1966/12/22)
 Etta Jones - So Warm (1961)
Booker Ervin - Heavy! (1968)
 Ella Fitzgerald – 1941
 Marvin Gaye - The Soulful Moods of Marvin Gaye (1961)
 Benny Goodman
 Al Haig- "Al Haig Today"(1964)
 Ahmad Jamal- "Poinciana"(1958)
 Roy Hargrove – Approaching Standards (1994)
 Earl Hines with Billy Eckstine – 1941
 Freddie Hubbard – Outpost (1981)
 Chrissie Hynde, of the Pretenders (2019)
 Harry James 
 Thad Jones
 Lee Konitz- Motion (reissue) (1961)
 Warne Marsh- "Warne Marsh Trios"(1975)
 Sonny Rollins – Saxophone Colossus (1956)
 Charlie Rouse - Yeah! (1961)
Cassandra Wilson - Blue Light ‘Til Dawn (1993)
 Nina Simone – Tribute to Billie Holiday (2008)
 Lennie Tristano – The New Tristano (1961)
 Dinah Washington - For Those In Love (1955)
 June Tabor - Some Other Time (1989)
 George Benson - Tenderly (George Benson album) (1989)
 John Martyn with the Guy Barker International Quintet in the film The Talented Mr Ripley (1999); also featured on Martyn's album Glasgow Walker
 Tony Bennett and Bill Evans - The Complete Tony Bennett/Bill Evans Recordings (2009)
 Jacky Terrasson and Stéphane Belmondo – Mother (2016)

Further reading
 Hischak, Thomas S. The Tin Pan Alley Song Encyclopedia, Greenwood Press, 2002.

References

1941 songs
1940s jazz standards
Songs with music by Gene de Paul
Songs written by Don Raye
Marvin Gaye songs
Nancy Wilson (jazz singer) songs
Andy Williams songs
Eva Cassidy songs
Jazz compositions in G minor